Jeremy Helmer (born 3 July 1997) is a Dutch professional footballer who plays as a winger.

Club career

Early career
Helmer played for SV Diemen before moving to AZ Alkmaar.

AZ Alkmaar
After playing in the youth teams at AZ Alkmaar, Jeremy Helmer was contracted on 1 July 2016 by AZ Alkmaar for two years. His league debut for the senior team came on 19 February 2017 in a 1–1 draw with Willem II. He was brought on for Mats Seuntjens in the 61st minute. His first goal for the senior squad came on 10 September 2017 in a 2–1 win over NAC Breda. His goal, assisted by Joris van Overeem, came in the 55th minute.

Personal life
Helmer's brother, Quinten, is also a footballer.

Honors
Jong AZ
 Tweede Divisie: 2016–17

References

External links
 
 
 Profile at ESPN FC
 Profile at AZ Alkmaar

1997 births
Living people
Sportspeople from Amstelveen
Association football wingers
Dutch footballers
Netherlands under-21 international footballers
Netherlands youth international footballers
Eredivisie players
Eerste Divisie players
AZ Alkmaar players
Jong AZ players
De Graafschap players
Footballers from North Holland
21st-century Dutch people